Austroagrion pindrina  is a species of damselfly in the family Coenagrionidae,
commonly known as a Pilbara billabongfly. 
It is a small damselfly; the male is blue and black.
It is endemic to the Pilbara region of Western Australia,
where it inhabits streams and still waters.

Gallery

See also
 List of Odonata species of Australia

References 

Coenagrionidae
Odonata of Australia
Insects of Australia
Endemic fauna of Australia
Taxa named by J.A.L. (Tony) Watson
Insects described in 1969
Damselflies